Invasion, in the world of comics, may refer to:

 Invasion! (DC Comics), a major storyline in the DC Universe
 Invasion! (2000 AD), a long series (with spin-offs and prequels) in 2000 AD
 British Invasion (comics), the late 1980s "invasion" of America by British comics talent

See also
Invasion (disambiguation)